Monographs in Systematic Botany also known as Monographs in Systematic Botany from the Missouri Botanical Garden is a series of monographs relating to the study of systematic botany. It is published by the Missouri Botanical Garden Press.

Monographs in Systematic Botany was established in 1978. By 2010 a total of 120 issues had been published, approximately 15% of which, relating to the flora of Latin America, are published in Spanish.

Abstracting and indexing 
Monographs of Systematic Botany is indexed and abstracted in BioOne.

References

External links 
 

Publications established in 1978
Botany journals
Multilingual journals
Irregular journals